China Airlines Flight 140 was a regularly scheduled passenger flight from Chiang Kai-shek International Airport (serving Taipei, Taiwan) to Nagoya Airport in Nagoya, Japan.

On 26 April 1994, the Airbus A300 serving the route was completing a routine flight and approach, when, just seconds before landing at Nagoya Airport, the takeoff/go-around setting (TO/GA) was inadvertently triggered. The pilots attempted to pitch the aircraft down while the autopilot, which was not disabled, was pitching the aircraft up. The aircraft ultimately stalled and crashed into the ground, killing 264 of the 271 people on board. The event remains the deadliest accident in the history of China Airlines.And it's the second deadliest air crash in Japan history.

Accident 

The flight took off from Chiang Kai-shek International Airport at 16:53 Taiwan Standard Time bound for Nagoya Airport. At the controls were Captain Wang Lo-chi, age 42, and First Officer Chuang Meng-jung, age 26. The en-route flight was uneventful; the descent started at 19:47 and the aircraft passed the outer marker at 20:12.

The crew attempted to correct the situation, manually reducing the throttles and pushing the yoke forward. However, they did not disconnect the autopilot, which was still acting on the inadvertent go-around command it had been given, so it increased its own efforts to overcome the action of the pilot. The autopilot followed its procedures and moved the horizontal stabilizer to its full nose-up position. The pilots, realizing the landing must be aborted and not understanding that the TO/GA was still engaged, then knowingly executed a manual go-around, pulling back on the yoke and adding to the nose-up attitude that the autopilot was already trying to execute. The aircraft levelled off for about 15 seconds and continued descending until about  where there were two bursts of thrust applied in quick succession and the aircraft was nose up in a steep climb. The resulting extreme nose-up attitude, combined with decreasing relative airspeed due to insufficient thrust, resulted in an aerodynamic stall. Airspeed dropped quickly, the aircraft stalled and struck the ground at 20:15:45. 31-year-old Noriyasu Shirai, a survivor, said that a flight attendant announced that the aircraft would crash after it stalled. Sylvanie Detonio, the only survivor who could be interviewed on 27 April, said that passengers received no warning prior to the crash.

Of the 271 people on board (15 crew and 256 passengers), only seven passengers survived. All of the survivors were seated in rows 7 through 15. On 27 April 1994, officials said there were 10 survivors (including a three-year-old) and that a Filipino, two Taiwanese, and seven Japanese survived. By 6 May, only seven remained alive, including three children.

Passengers 
The passengers included 153 Japanese people, and 18 Filipino people. Taiwanese people made up a large portion of the remainder.

Investigation 
The crash, which destroyed the aircraft (delivered less than three years earlier in 1991), was primarily attributed to crew error for their failure to correct the controls as well as the airspeed. Nine months earlier, Airbus had advised its customers to modify the air flight system so it would fully disengage the autopilot "when certain manual controls input is applied on the control wheel in GO-AROUND mode", which would have included the yoke-forward movement the pilots made on this accident flight.  The accident aircraft was scheduled to only receive the update the next time it required a more substantial service break, because "China Airlines judged that the modifications were not urgent". These factors were deemed contributing incidents to the crash, after the primary failure of the pilots to take control of the situation once it began.

The investigation also revealed that the pilot had been trained for the A300 on a flight simulator in Bangkok which was not programmed with the problematic GO-AROUND behavior. Therefore, his belief that pushing on the yoke would override the automatic controls was appropriate for the configuration he had trained on, as well as for the Boeing 747 aircraft that he had spent most of his career flying.

Court proceedings 

Japanese prosecutors declined to pursue charges of professional negligence on the airline's senior management as it was "difficult to call into question the criminal responsibility of the four individuals because aptitude levels achieved through training at the carrier were similar to those at other airlines". The pilots could not be prosecuted since they had died in the accident.

A class action suit was filed against China Airlines and Airbus Industries for compensation. In December 2003, the Nagoya District Court ordered China Airlines to pay a combined 5 billion yen to 232 people, but cleared Airbus of liability.  Some of the bereaved and survivors felt that the compensation was inadequate and a further class action suit was filed and ultimately settled in April 2007 when the airline apologized for the accident and provided additional compensation.

Software upgrade 
There had been earlier "out-of-trim incidents" with the Airbus A300-600R. Airbus had the company that made the flight control computer produce a modification to the air flight system that would disengage the autopilot "when certain manual controls input is applied on the control wheel in GO-AROUND mode". This modification was first available in September 1993 and the aircraft that had crashed had been scheduled to receive the upgrade. The aircraft had not received the update at the time of the crash because "China Airlines judged that the modifications were not urgent".

Aftermath 
On 3 May 1994, the Civil Aeronautics Administration (CAA) of the Republic of China (Taiwan) ordered China Airlines to modify the flight control computers following Airbus's notice of the modification. On 7 May 1994, the CAA ordered China Airlines to provide supplementary training and a re-evaluation of proficiency to all A300-600R pilots.

Following the crash, China Airlines decided to withdraw its flight CI140 on this route and changed it to CI150 after the crash. China Airlines now operates this route with the Airbus A330-300 aircraft and the A300 has since been retired.

On 26 April 2014, 300 mourners gathered in Kasugai, Aichi Prefecture, for a memorial to the crash on the 20th anniversary of the crash.

Dramatization 

The crash was featured in the ninth episode of season 18 of Mayday (Air Crash Investigations). The episode is titled "Deadly Go-Around".

See also 
 China Airlines Flight 676, another  A300 that crashed in almost identical circumstances in 1998

Notes

References 

 Air Disaster, Vol. 3, by Macarthur Job, Aerospace Publications Pty. Ltd. (Australia), 1998 , pp. 139–155.
 Official report from the Japanese Aircraft Accidents Investigation Commission (In Japanese) (English translation) (Archive)
 Failure Knowledge Database on this accident (Archive)

External links 

  Aircraft Accident Investigation Report – Aircraft Accident Investigation Commission (Archive)
 English appendices text version – Prepared for the World Wide Web by Marco Gröning
  Aircraft Accident Investigation Report – Aircraft Accident Investigation Commission (Original version, version of record)
 
 2ND LD: Taiwan's China Airlines ordered to pay 5 bil. yen over crash.
 Cockpit voice recorder transcript from the flight
 "Kin settle over 1994 China Air Nagoya crash." Kyodo at the Japan Times. Friday 20 April 2007. (Archive)
 China Airlines Airbus A300-600R (Flight 140) Misses Landing and Goes Up in Flame at Nagoya Airport (Archive)
 "Kin allowed to view CAL crash victims' photos." The Japan Times. Wednesday, 7 January 2004.
 "Japanese find flight recorder in plane crash." The New York Times at the Houston Chronicle. Thursday 28 April 1994. A14. (Archive)
 "Brothers recovering (World briefs) Houston Chronicle. Saturday 7 May 1994. A26. (Archive)

Airliner accidents and incidents caused by pilot error
Aviation accidents and incidents in 1994
Aviation accidents and incidents in Japan
1994 in Japan
Accidents and incidents involving the Airbus A300
140
1994 in Taiwan
April 1994 events in Asia
Airliner accidents and incidents caused by stalls
Airliner accidents and incidents caused by design or manufacturing errors
1994 disasters in Japan